Marcello Piacentini (8 December 1881 – 19 May 1960) was an Italian urban theorist and one of the main proponents of Italian Fascist architecture.

Biography
Born in Rome, he was the son of architect Pio Piacentini. When he was only 26, he was commissioned to revamp of the historical center of Bergamo (1907); subsequently, he worked in most of Italy, but his best works are those commissioned by the Fascist government in Rome.

Piacentini devised a "simplified neoclassicism" midway between the neo-classicism of the Novecento Italiano group (Gio Ponti and others) and the rationalism of the Gruppo 7 of Giuseppe Terragni, Adalberto Libera and others. His style became a mainstay of Fascist architecture in Rome, including the new university campus (Università di Roma La Sapienza, 1932) and the E.U.R district, of which he was not only designer, but also High Commissar by will of Benito Mussolini. His other works include the renovation of Brescia and Livorno, the Museo Nazionale della Magna Grecia in Reggio Calabria, the opening of Via della Conciliazione in Rome, and the restoration of the Rome Opera House (1928–1958).

Piacentini became an important colonial architect, particularly in Cyrenaica in Eastern Libya. The style of his buildings is characteristic of the Neo-Moorish period of Italian colonial architecture in Libya in the 1920s. This is evident in his Albergo Italia as well as the Berenice Theatre in Benghazi. Piacentini was made project manager of all Italian building works in Cyrenaica.
He was also professor of Urban Planning at La Sapienza, of which he was also president. After the fall of the Fascist regime he did not work as architect for several years. He died in Rome in 1960.

Works 

Potenza, Progetto Ophelia (Ophelia Project), 1910
Benghazi, Albergo Italia (Italia Hotel, known beforehand as Grande Albergo Roma) 1913 (along with architect Luigi Piccinato) 
Benghazi, Benghazi Central Railway Station, 1916
Acqui Terme, Villa Ottolenghi, 1920, with Federico d’Amato, later Pietro Porcinai completed the villa and the park.
Benghazi, Interior of the City Hall, 1925 
Benghazi, Berenice Theatre, 1928
Bolzano Victory Monument, 1926–1928
Brescia, Piazza della Vittoria, 1927–1932
Brescia, Torrione INA, 1930–1932 
Genoa, Arco della Vittoria, 1931
Bolzano, Army Headquarters, 1933–1935
Jerusalem, Generali Building, 1934–1935
Reggio Calabria, Museo Nazionale della Magna Grecia, 1932–1941
Rome, church of Sacro Cuore di Cristo Re, 1920–1934
Rome, restore of Teatro dell'Opera di Roma, 1926–1928
Rome, planning for Sapienza University of Rome campus, 1935
Rome, Via della Conciliazione, 1936–1950, with Attilio Spaccarelli
 Zagreb, Assicurazioni Generali Building, 1937
Rome, planning for EUR district, 1938–1942
Rome, Albergo degli Ambasciatori (Via Veneto), 1925–1932
São Paulo, Matarazzo Building, 1939
Rome, Teatro Sistina (1946–1949)
Rome, Cappella universitaria Divina Sapienza (1947–1952)
Ferrara, Nuovo Palazzo della Ragione (1954–1956)
Rome, Palazzo dello Sport (1960), in collaboration with Pier Luigi Nervi

References

 Piacentini Marcello. Fascismo - Architettura - Arte / Arte fascista web site

Sources

  Luigi Monzo, trasformismo architettonico – Piacentinis Kirche Sacro Cuore di Cristo Re in Rom im Kontext der kirchenbaulichen Erneuerung im faschistischen Italien, in Kunst und Politik. Jahrbuch der Guernica-Gesellschaft, 15.2013, pp. 83-100.
  Christine Beese, Marcello Piacentini. Moderner Städtebau in Italien. Berlin 2016.
  Luigi Monzo, Review to Beese, Christine: Marcello Piacentini. Moderner Städtebau in Italien, Berlin 2016. In architectura: Zeitschrift für Geschichte der Baukunst, 45.2015/1 (published October 2016), pp. 88-91.

1881 births
1960 deaths
Artists from Rome
20th-century Italian architects
Architects from Rome
Italian fascist architecture
Members of the Royal Academy of Italy
Academic staff of the Sapienza University of Rome